David Malcolm Rollitt was a retired England rugby union international and teacher, who won eleven caps between 1967 and 1975. He played in the position of No 8.

He was educated at Barnsley Grammar school and attended Bristol University, where he studied physics. He then trained as a teacher at The Loughborough Colleges.

He played club rugby for Wakefield RFC and Bristol. During his international career, he played eleven times for England making his debut in February 1967 against Ireland. His last appearance came in May 1975 whilst England were touring, against Australia. He scored one try for England.

He played 16 times in his career for the Barbarians. Whilst at The Loughborough Colleges, he was picked for the Barbarians against Bradford in October 1965 scoring two tries.

He later taught mathematics at St Paul's School, London, where he also coached rugby part-time.

He died in December 2022.

References

 Wakefield Rugby Football Club—1901-2001 A Centenary History. Written and compiled by David Ingall in 2001.

1943 births
Living people
English rugby union players
England international rugby union players
Wakefield RFC players
Bristol Bears players
Barbarian F.C. players
Rugby union players from Barnsley
Loughborough Students RUFC players
Gloucestershire County RFU players
People educated at Holgate School, Barnsley
Rugby union number eights